The Neufahrn Link is a double-track and electrified main line in the German state of Bavaria. It connects Neufahrn bei Freising station on the Munich–Regensburg railway with Munich Airport.

Route

The line branches to the northeast from Neufahrn bei Freising station at a grade-separated junction from the Munich–Regensburg railway. After a few hundred metres it meets the A92 autobahn and then runs parallel with it. In Achering it passes under the B11 at Freising South interchange. After that, the line runs along the autobahn through the Isar grassland, crosses the Isar and then follows the airport access road. Just before the perimeter of the airport, it reaches München Flughafen (Munich Airport) West junction on the Munich East–Munich Airport railway.

History

After the opening of the Munich Airport in 1992, the only line that connected it to the rail network was the Munich East–Munich Airport railway. The Neufahrn Link was built to establish a second connection. The first sod was turned for the construction on 18 March 1997 and the line was opened on 29 November 1998.

Operations
This runs from Munich East via the S-Bahn trunk line and the Munich–Regensburg railway to Neufahrn. Here trains are usually uncoupled. The front section continues on to Freising and the rear section runs over the Neufahrn Link to the airport. In addition to the S-Bahn, occasional freight trains run to the airport.

Future
As part of the Erding Ring Closure (Erdinger Ringschluss) project, the airport will also be linked to eastern Bavaria.

References

Munich S-Bahn lines
Airport rail links in Germany
Buildings and structures in Freising (district)
Railway lines opened in 1998
1998 establishments in Germany